Dead Like Me is an American comedy-drama television series created by Bryan Fuller that premiered on June 27, 2003, on Showtime in the United States and ended on October 31, 2004. The show spans two seasons, with a total of 29 episodes. The original pilot is 74 minutes long, while the episodes that follow are 40 to 50 minutes. Showtime canceled the series due to declining ratings in the second season, even though originally they claimed the show had three times higher ratings than the network's primetime average. Various actors also mentioned that the show had backstage problems, which was one of the reasons the creator left the series during the first season.

Both seasons of Dead Like Me were released on DVD in United States and United Kingdom in 2004 and 2005, respectively. A direct-to-DVD film titled Dead Like Me: Life After Death was released on February 17, 2009. The episodes were filmed primarily in Vancouver, British Columbia.

Series overview

Season 1 (2003)
The first season premiered with a 74-minute pilot episode on June 27, 2003, which was split into two different episodes with added deleted scenes for syndication. It consisted of 14 episodes, and ended on September 26, 2003. The story begins with George Lass getting killed by a toilet seat falling from the de-orbiting Mir Space Station and having to face the fact that she is now dead but still amongst living people, working as a grim reaper. George meets other grim reapers, each with their own problems, and has to learn how to do her job efficiently. While breaking the rules and testing the patience of her handler, George learns by the end of season just how important her job is.

Season 2 (2004)
The second season premiered on July 25, 2004, and ran for 15 episodes, concluding on October 31, 2004. The season explores the lives of other grim reapers while following the story of George, who has now been promoted at her daily job and is beginning to explore her love life. Roxy advances in her career; Daisy finds herself in an abusive relationship; Mason fights to stop drinking; Rube is facing ghosts from his past; and Joy and Clancy have to adapt to the end of their marriage.

Home media

References

External links 
 

Dead Like Me
Lists of American comedy-drama television series episodes
Lists of fantasy television series episodes